Carol Elizabeth Marett (born 11 May 1944) is a New Zealand former cricketer who played as an all-rounder, batting right-handed and bowling right-arm medium. She appeared in 7 Test matches and 14 One Day Internationals for New Zealand between 1972 and 1982. She played domestic cricket for Auckland, Otago and North Shore.

References

External links
 
 

1944 births
Living people
Cricketers from Auckland
New Zealand women cricketers
New Zealand women Test cricketers
New Zealand women One Day International cricketers
Auckland Hearts cricketers
Otago Sparks cricketers
North Shore women cricketers